United States competed at the FIS Alpine World Ski Championships 2021 in Cortina d'Ampezzo, United States, from 8 to 21 February 2021.

Medalists

References

External links
 U.S. Ski & Snowboard
 Cortina 2021 official site

Nations at the FIS Alpine World Ski Championships 2021
Alpine World Ski Championships
United States at the FIS Alpine World Ski Championships